Susan Shaw Devesa (born June 24, 1944) is an American cancer epidemiologist who conducts descriptive research of the patterns of cancer in the United States. She was a section chief of descriptive studies at the National Cancer Institute.

Life 
Devesa was born June 24, 1944 in Washington, D.C. She completed a B.A. in mathematics from Earlham College in 1966. She studied in France for a portion of her undergraduate degree. In 1966, Devesa joined the demography section in the biometry branch at the National Cancer Institute (NCI). She earned a M.H.S. (1974) and Ph.D. (1979) in epidemiology from the Johns Hopkins School of Hygiene and Public Health in 1974. Her dissertation was titled A study of the association of cancer incidence with income and education among whites and blacks. Earl L. Diamond was her doctoral advisor. 

Devesa was appointed chief of the descriptive studies section in 1993. She is a fellow of the American College of Epidemiology. She received the United States Public Health Service (PHS) special recognition award for descriptive studies of the changing patterns of cancer in the United States, which have provided clues to etiologic risk factors, and the NCI division of cancer epidemiology and genetics (DCEG) exemplary service award in recognition of sustained research accomplishments and outstanding service to the Division and the NCI, resulting in the advancement of the goals of the National Cancer Program.

See also 

 List of Earlham College people
 List of Johns Hopkins University people
 List of women in statistics

References 

Living people
Johns Hopkins Bloomberg School of Public Health alumni
National Institutes of Health people
Cancer epidemiologists
American women epidemiologists
American epidemiologists
20th-century American women scientists
21st-century American women scientists
1944 births
Earlham College alumni
Scientists from Washington, D.C.